Hannah Alligood, sometimes credited as Hannah Riley, is an American actress known for her role as Frankie in the FX television series Better Things.

Life and career
Alligood was born in Birmingham, Alabama. In 2015, Alligood was nominated for a Young Artist award in the Supporting Actress category for her work as young Margo in the film Paper Towns. The following year, she played minor roles in two films, Allegiant, and Miracles from Heaven. It was also in 2016 that she auditioned for and won the high-profile role of Frankie on Better Things. 

A November 2017 Apple ad for their iPad Pro featured Alligood as Brooklynite "Scout", utilizing the product in a number of ways traditionally seen with a personal computer, leading to the end where a neighbor asks Scout what she is doing with her computer, and she answers, not knowing what a computer is.

Filmography

References

External links

Living people
American child actresses
Actresses from Birmingham, Alabama
American film actresses
American television actresses
21st-century American actresses
Year of birth missing (living people)